The Church of Saint Athanasius, also known as Sant'Atanasio dei Greci (Ekklisia Agiou Athanasiou ton Ellinon), is a Greek Catholic titular church located on Via del Babuino 149, near the Spanish steps, in the rione Campo Marzio of Rome, Italy.

History
The church was built in 1577 for use of a Greek College for the formation of Catholic clergy in the Eastern Rite. Construction was patronized by the Pope Gregory XIII and the Jesuit order to promulgate and serve the interests forming a Congregation of the Greeks.

In 1872 the church was entrusted to the Congregation for the Oriental Churches. On the 22 February 1962 Pope John XXIII granted it a titular church as a seat for Cardinals. At present the Titulus San Athanasii is held by Lucian Cardinal Mureșan.

Architecture
The main layout was designed by Giacomo della Porta, although the facade was attributed to Martino Longhi the Elder. The facade is placed between two towers covered with domes, which is divided into two horizontal bands by a marble ledge. Either side of a large window is written an inscription, one in Greek and the other in Latin in honor of Saint Athanasius of Alexandria. On the left stands a tower clock, donated by Pope Clement XIV in 1771, which faces the palace of the Pontifical Greek College.

The interior was frescoed by Francesco Tibaldi, and contained altarpieces by Cavalier d'Arpino. In the past, the library was said to hold the library of Leo Allatius.

List of Cardinal priests
 Gabriel Acacius Coussa (22 March 1962 - 29 July 1962)  
 Josyf Ivanovyce Slipyj (25 February 1965 - 7 September 1984)
 Lucian Mureșan (18 February 2012 - present)

In the novel and film, Shoes of the Fisherman,  Ukrainian Kiril Lakota, Eastern rite Metropolitan Archbishop of Livov, is appointed cardinal priest with Saint Athanasius as his titular church (before being elected Pope).

References

Sources
 M. Armellini, Le chiese di Roma dal secolo IV al XIX, Roma 1891, pp. 339
 F. Titi, Descrizione delle Pitture, Sculture e Architetture esposte in Roma, Roma 1763, p. 381
 C. Rendina, Le Chiese di Roma, Newton & Compton Editori, Milano 2000, p. 40
 M. Quercioli, Rione IV Campo Marzio, in AA.VV, I rioni di Roma, Newton & Compton Editori, Milano 2000, Vol. I, pp. 264–334

External links 

 Pages about the church (it)

Roman Catholic churches completed in 1583
Atanasio
National churches in Rome
16th-century Roman Catholic church buildings in Italy
Dicastery for the Eastern Churches
Eastern Catholic church buildings in Italy
Greek diaspora in Europe
Greece–Italy relations
Atanasio